Ahya Simone (born 1994) is an American multidisciplinary artist. Based in Detroit, she is best known for her work as a harpist and for creating and starring in the web series Femme Queen Chronicles.

Early life and education 
Simone was born and raised in Detroit, Michigan. She grew up singing in the church choir and started to play harp as a student at Cass Technical High School when she was 16.

While attending college at Wayne State University she came out as transgender.  She was the principal harpist for the university's symphony.

Career

Music 
After college Simone sought out ways to perform outside her previous experience "playing 300-year-old dead people music, and being around all these white suburban kids who had access I never did, who’d been playing classical music since they were two years old." She began to cover r&b and soul music, and named Dorothy Ashby as one of her biggest influences. This led her to collaborate with fellow Detroiter dream hampton, to score hampton's short film Treasure (2018). Simone received a Kresge Artist Fellowship in 2018 and was the first Black trans woman recipient. That year she also teamed up with Kelela on Take Me a_Part, the Remixes. 

In addition to her work as a harpist, Simone is a singer-songwriter whose music fuses r&b, jazz, experimental, and electronic. Simone released the single "Frostbite" in 2020. She later released a music video for the song featuring local artists Kesswa and Supercoolwicked.

Other work 
In 2015 she founded the Trans Sistas of Color Project Detroit to provide support to trans women of color after the murder of Amber Monroe. Through the organization she launched the comedy web series Femme Queen Chronicles that follows four trans women in Detroit, which she likened to Living Single and Chewing Gum. Simone developed the series in part to "disrupt the narrative of black tragedy without sanitizing the very real tragedies that happen to us." She is the director, writer, and stars in the series. Femme Queen Chronicles debuted in 2018 and received positive critical reception. She received financial support from the Knight Foundation to develop the series. As of 2021, she is working with Janet Mock to adapt the show for television.

References

External links 
 Official website

Living people
African-American women artists
American harpists
African-American women singer-songwriters
African-American actresses
Artists from Detroit
Cass Technical High School alumni
Wayne State University alumni
LGBT African Americans
Transgender actresses
Transgender artists
Transgender singers
Transgender women musicians
LGBT people from Michigan
Musicians from Detroit

1994 births
21st-century African-American people
21st-century American LGBT people
21st-century African-American women
Singer-songwriters from Michigan